Fumarin, also known as coumafuryl is a coumarin derivative, a structural analog of warfarin. It can be used as rodenticide.

References 

2-Furyl compounds
Chromones